The Columbia Terminal Railroad  is a local, short-line, freight railroad in Boone County, Missouri owned by and serving the city of Columbia, Missouri. The railroad runs from Columbia to the Norfolk Southern Railway mainline in Centralia, using the former Columbia Branch of the Wabash Railroad.

Formerly, the line carried passengers to the Wabash Railroad Station and Freight House in Downtown Columbia, Missouri. The line was created by the Boone County and Jefferson City Railroad Company, incorporated 1857. Construction began after the American Civil War and was completed in 1867.

History

The  line between Columbia and Centralia was completed by the Boone County and Jefferson City Railroad in 1867; the North Missouri Railroad, a predecessor of the Wabash Railroad, had leased that company the previous year. After a series of reorganizations and mergers the Wabash took direct ownership of the branch in 1902. When the Norfolk Southern Railway, successor to the Wabash, proposed the abandon the line in 1987, the city of Columbia acquired the line and created the Columbia Terminal Railroad to serve freight customers along the route.

See also
Boone County Historical Society
List of cemeteries in Boone County, Missouri

Notes

References

Further reading

External links
 
 ColumbiaBranchRailroad.com

Rail transportation in Columbia, Missouri
Transportation in Boone County, Missouri
Railway companies established in 1987
Missouri railroads